The Demi River is a river in Saurashtra region of Gujarat, India.

Its basin has a  maximum length of 75 km. Demi-1, Demi-2 and Demi-3 are dams on this river. Tankara city is situated of the bank of Demi river.

References 

Rivers of Gujarat
Rivers of India